The Upanishads are late Vedic Sanskrit texts that supplied the basis of later Hindu philosophy. They are the most recent part of the Vedas, the oldest scriptures of Hinduism, and deal with meditation, philosophy, consciousness, and ontological knowledge; earlier parts of the Vedas deal with mantras, benedictions, rituals, ceremonies, and sacrifices. While among the most important literature in the history of Indian religions and culture, the Upanishads document a wide variety of "rites, incarnations, and esoteric knowledge" departing from Vedic ritualism and interpreted in various ways in the later commentarial traditions. Of all Vedic literature, the Upanishads alone are widely known, and their diverse ideas, interpreted in various ways, informed the later traditions of Hinduism.

The Upanishads are commonly referred to as Vedānta. Vedanta has been interpreted as the "last chapters, parts of the Veda" and alternatively as "object, the highest purpose of the Veda". The aim of all Upanishads is to investigate the nature of Ātman (self), and "direct[ing] the enquirer toward it." Various ideas about the relation between Atman and Brahman can be found, and later commentators tried to harmonize this diversity. Along with the Bhagavad Gita and the Brahmasutra, the mukhya Upanishads (known collectively as the Prasthanatrayi) provide a foundation for the several later schools of Vedanta, including Adi Shankara's Advaita Vedanta (monistic or nondualistic), Ramanuja's ( 1077–1157 CE) Vishishtadvaita (qualified monism), and Madhvacharya's (1199–1278 CE) Dvaita (dualism).

Around 108 Upanishads are known, of which the first dozen or so are the oldest and most important and are referred to as the principal or main (mukhya) Upanishads. The mukhya Upanishads are found mostly in the concluding part of the Brahmanas and Aranyakas and were, for centuries, memorized by each generation and passed down orally. The mukhya Upanishads predate the Common Era, but there is no scholarly consensus on their date, or even on which ones are pre- or post-Buddhist. The Brhadaranyaka is seen as particularly ancient by modern scholars.

Of the remainder, 95 Upanishads are part of the Muktikā canon, composed from about the last centuries of 1st-millennium BCE through about 15th-century CE. New Upanishads, beyond the 108 in the Muktika canon, continued to be composed through the early modern and modern era, though often dealing with subjects that are unconnected to the Vedas.

With the translation of the Upanishads in the early 19th century they also started to attract attention from a Western audience. German philosopher Arthur Schopenhauer was deeply impressed by the Upanishads and called it "the most profitable and elevating reading which... is possible in the world". Modern era Indologists have discussed the similarities between the fundamental concepts in the Upanishads and major Western philosophers.

Etymology
The Sanskrit term  (from upa "by" and ni-ṣad "sit down") translates to "sitting down near", referring to the student sitting down near the teacher while receiving spiritual knowledge.(Gurumukh) Other dictionary meanings include "esoteric doctrine" and "secret doctrine". Monier-Williams' Sanskrit Dictionary notes – "According to native authorities, Upanishad means setting to rest ignorance by revealing the knowledge of the supreme spirit."

The word appears in the verses of many Upanishads, such as the fourth verse of the 13th volume in first chapter of the Chandogya Upanishad. Max Müller as well as Paul Deussen translate the word Upanishad in these verses as "secret doctrine", Robert Hume translates it as "mystic meaning", while Patrick Olivelle translates it as "hidden connections".

Development

Authorship
The authorship of most Upanishads is unknown. Radhakrishnan states, "almost all the early literature of India was anonymous, we do not know the names of the authors of the Upanishads". The ancient Upanishads are embedded in the Vedas, the oldest of Hinduism's religious scriptures, which some traditionally consider to be apauruṣeya, which means "not of a man, superhuman" and "impersonal, authorless". The Vedic texts assert that they were skillfully created by Rishis (sages), after inspired creativity, just as a carpenter builds a chariot.

The various philosophical theories in the early Upanishads have been attributed to famous sages such as Yajnavalkya, Uddalaka Aruni, Shvetaketu, Shandilya, Aitareya, Balaki, Pippalada, and Sanatkumara. Women, such as Maitreyi and Gargi, participate in the dialogues and are also credited in the early Upanishads. There are some exceptions to the anonymous tradition of the Upanishads. The Shvetashvatara Upanishad, for example, includes closing credits to sage Shvetashvatara, and he is considered the author of the Upanishad.

Many scholars believe that early Upanishads were interpolated and expanded over time. There are differences within manuscripts of the same Upanishad discovered in different parts of South Asia, differences in non-Sanskrit version of the texts that have survived, and differences within each text in terms of meter, style, grammar and structure. The existing texts are believed to be the work of many authors.

Chronology
Scholars are uncertain about when the Upanishads were composed. The chronology of the early Upanishads is difficult to resolve, states philosopher and Sanskritist Stephen Phillips, because all opinions rest on scanty evidence and analysis of archaism, style and repetitions across texts, and are driven by assumptions about likely evolution of ideas, and presumptions about which philosophy might have influenced which other Indian philosophies. Indologist Patrick Olivelle says that "in spite of claims made by some, in reality, any dating of these documents [early Upanishads] that attempts a precision closer than a few centuries is as stable as a house of cards".

Some scholars have tried to analyse similarities between Hindu Upanishads and Buddhist literature to establish chronology for the Upanishads. Precise dates are impossible, and most scholars give only broad ranges encompassing various centuries. Gavin Flood states that "the Upanisads are not a homogeneous group of texts. Even the older texts were composed over a wide expanse of time from about 600 to 300 BCE." Stephen Phillips places the early or "principal" Upanishads in the 800 to 300 BCE range.

Patrick Olivelle, a Sanskrit Philologist and Indologist, gives the following chronology for the early Upanishads, also called the Principal Upanishads:
 The Brhadaranyaka and the Chandogya are the two earliest Upanishads. They are edited texts, some of whose sources are much older than others. The two texts are pre-Buddhist; they may be placed in the 7th to 6th centuries BCE, give or take a century or so.
 The three other early prose Upanisads—Taittiriya, Aitareya, and Kausitaki come next; all are probably pre-Buddhist and can be assigned to the 6th to 5th centuries BCE.
 The Kena is the oldest of the verse Upanisads followed by probably the Katha, Isa, Svetasvatara, and Mundaka. All these Upanisads were composed probably in the last few centuries BCE. According to Olivelle, "All exhibit strong theistic tendencies and are probably the earliest literary products of the theistic tradition, whose later literature includes the Bhagavad Gita and the Puranas." 
 The two late prose Upanisads, the Prasna and the Mandukya, cannot be much older than the beginning of the common era.
Meanwhile, the Indologist Johannes Bronkhorst argues for a later date for the Upanishads than has generally been accepted. Bronkhorst places even the oldest of the Upanishads, such as the Brhadaranyaka as possibly still being composed at "a date close to Katyayana and Patañjali [the grammarian]" (i.e.,  2nd century BCE).

The later Upanishads, numbering about 95, also called minor Upanishads, are dated from the late 1st-millennium BCE to mid 2nd-millennium CE. Gavin Flood dates many of the twenty Yoga Upanishads to be probably from the 100 BCE to 300 CE period. Patrick Olivelle and other scholars date seven of the twenty Sannyasa Upanishads to likely have been complete sometime between the last centuries of the 1st-millennium BCE to 300 CE. About half of the Sannyasa Upanishads were likely composed in 14th- to 15th-century CE.

Geography

The general area of the composition of the early Upanishads is considered as northern India. The region is bounded on the west by the upper Indus valley, on the east by lower Ganges region, on the north by the Himalayan foothills, and on the south by the Vindhya mountain range. Scholars are reasonably sure that the early Upanishads were produced at the geographical center of ancient Brahmanism, comprising the regions of Kuru-Panchala and Kosala-Videha together with the areas immediately to the south and west of these. This region covers modern Bihar, Nepal, Uttar Pradesh, Uttarakhand, Himachal Pradesh, Haryana, eastern Rajasthan, and northern Madhya Pradesh.

While significant attempts have been made recently to identify the exact locations of the individual Upanishads, the results are tentative. Witzel identifies the center of activity in the Brihadaranyaka Upanishad as the area of Videha, whose king, Janaka, features prominently in the Upanishad. The Chandogya Upanishad was probably composed in a more western than eastern location in the Indian subcontinent, possibly somewhere in the western region of the Kuru-Panchala country.

Compared to the Principal Upanishads, the new Upanishads recorded in the  belong to an entirely different region, probably southern India, and are considerably relatively recent. In the fourth chapter of the Kaushitaki Upanishad, a location named Kashi (modern Varanasi) is mentioned.

Classification

Muktika canon: major and minor Upanishads
There are more than 200 known Upanishads, one of which, the  Upanishad, predates 1656 CE and contains a list of 108 canonical Upanishads, including itself as the last. These are further divided into Upanishads associated with Shaktism (goddess Shakti), Sannyasa (renunciation, monastic life), Shaivism (god Shiva), Vaishnavism (god Vishnu), Yoga, and Sāmānya (general, sometimes referred to as Samanya-Vedanta).

Some of the Upanishads are categorized as "sectarian" since they present their ideas through a particular god or goddess of a specific Hindu tradition such as Vishnu, Shiva, Shakti, or a combination of these such as the Skanda Upanishad. These traditions sought to link their texts as Vedic, by asserting their texts to be an Upanishad, thereby a Śruti. Most of these sectarian Upanishads, for example the Rudrahridaya Upanishad and the Mahanarayana Upanishad, assert that all the Hindu gods and goddesses are the same, all an aspect and manifestation of Brahman, the Vedic concept for metaphysical ultimate reality before and after the creation of the Universe.

Principal Upanishads

The Principal Upanishads, also known as the Mukhya Upanishads, can be grouped into periods. Of the early periods are the Brihadaranyaka and the Chandogya, the oldest.

The Aitareya, Kauṣītaki and Taittirīya Upanishads may date to as early as the mid-1st millennium BCE, while the remnant date from between roughly the 4th to 1st centuries BCE, roughly contemporary with the earliest portions of the Sanskrit epics. One chronology assumes that the Aitareya, Taittiriya, Kausitaki, Mundaka, Prasna, and Katha Upanishads has Buddha's influence, and is consequently placed after the 5th century BCE, while another proposal questions this assumption and dates it independent of Buddha's date of birth. The Kena, Mandukya, and Isa Upanishads are typically placed after these Principal Upanishads, but other scholars date these differently. But Richard King's chronology of Upanishads is totally wrong and refuted by Modern scholars as Aitreya, Taittiriya, Kena, Isa, Katha have no Buddhist influence and were formed before the birth of Buddha. Not much is known about the authors except for those, like Yajnavalkayva and Uddalaka, mentioned in the texts. A few women discussants, such as Gargi and Maitreyi, the wife of Yajnavalkayva, also feature occasionally.

Each of the principal Upanishads can be associated with one of the schools of exegesis of the four Vedas (shakhas). Many Shakhas are said to have existed, of which only a few remain. The new Upanishads often have little relation to the Vedic corpus and have not been cited or commented upon by any great Vedanta philosopher: their language differs from that of the classic Upanishads, being less subtle and more formalized. As a result, they are not difficult to comprehend for the modern reader.

New Upanishads
There is no fixed list of the Upanishads as newer ones, beyond the Muktika anthology of 108 Upanishads, have continued to be discovered and composed. In 1908, for example, four previously unknown Upanishads were discovered in newly found manuscripts, and these were named Bashkala, Chhagaleya, Arsheya, and Saunaka, by Friedrich Schrader, who attributed them to the first prose period of the Upanishads. The text of three of them, namely the Chhagaleya, Arsheya, and Saunaka, were incomplete and inconsistent, likely poorly maintained or corrupted.

Ancient Upanishads have long enjoyed a revered position in Hindu traditions, and authors of numerous sectarian texts have tried to benefit from this reputation by naming their texts as Upanishads. These "new Upanishads" number in the hundreds, cover diverse range of topics from physiology to renunciation to sectarian theories. They were composed between the last centuries of the 1st millennium BCE through the early modern era (~1600 CE). While over two dozen of the minor Upanishads are dated to pre-3rd century CE, many of these new texts under the title of "Upanishads" originated in the first half of the 2nd millennium CE, they are not Vedic texts, and some do not deal with themes found in the Vedic Upanishads.

The main Shakta Upanishads, for example, mostly discuss doctrinal and interpretative differences between the two principal sects of a major Tantric form of Shaktism called Shri Vidya upasana. The many extant lists of authentic Shakta Upaniṣads vary, reflecting the sect of their compilers, so that they yield no evidence of their "location" in Tantric tradition, impeding correct interpretation. The Tantra content of these texts also weaken its identity as an Upaniṣad for non-Tantrikas. Sectarian texts such as these do not enjoy status as shruti and thus the authority of the new Upanishads as scripture is not accepted in Hinduism.

Association with Vedas
All Upanishads are associated with one of the four Vedas—Rigveda, Samaveda, Yajurveda (there are two primary versions or Samhitas of the Yajurveda: Shukla Yajurveda, Krishna Yajurveda), and Atharvaveda. During the modern era, the ancient Upanishads that were embedded texts in the Vedas, were detached from the Brahmana and Aranyaka layers of Vedic text, compiled into separate texts and these were then gathered into anthologies of the Upanishads. These lists associated each Upanishad with one of the four Vedas, many such lists exist, and these lists are inconsistent across India in terms of which Upanishads are included and how the newer Upanishads are assigned to the ancient Vedas. In south India, the collected list based on Muktika Upanishad, and published in Telugu language, became the most common by the 19th-century and this is a list of 108 Upanishads. In north India, a list of 52 Upanishads has been most common.

The  Upanishad's list of 108 Upanishads groups the first 13 as mukhya, 21 as Sāmānya Vedānta, 20 as Sannyāsa, 14 as Vaishnava, 12 as Shaiva, 8 as Shakta, and 20 as Yoga. The mukhya Upanishads are the most important and highlighted.

Philosophy

The Upanishadic age was characterized by a pluralism of worldviews. While some Upanishads have been deemed 'monistic', others, including the Katha Upanishad, are dualistic. The Maitri is one of the Upanishads that inclines more toward dualism, thus grounding classical Samkhya and Yoga schools of Hinduism, in contrast to the non-dualistic Upanishads at the foundation of its Vedanta school. They contain a plurality of ideas.

The Upanishads include sections on philosophical theories that have been at the foundation of Indian traditions. For example, the Chandogya Upanishad includes one of the earliest known declarations of Ahimsa (non-violence) as an ethical precept. Discussion of other ethical premises such as Damah (temperance, self-restraint), Satya (truthfulness), Dāna (charity), Ārjava (non-hypocrisy), Daya (compassion), and others are found in the oldest Upanishads and many later Upanishads. Similarly, the Karma doctrine is presented in the Brihadaranyaka Upanishad, which is the oldest Upanishad.

Development of thought

While the hymns of the Vedas emphasize rituals and the Brahmanas serve as a liturgical manual for those Vedic rituals, the spirit of the Upanishads is inherently opposed to ritual. The older Upanishads launch attacks of increasing intensity on the ritual. Anyone who worships a divinity other than the self is called a domestic animal of the gods in the Brihadaranyaka Upanishad. The  Upanishad parodies those who indulge in the acts of sacrifice by comparing them with a procession of dogs chanting Om! Let's eat. Om! Let's drink.

The Kaushitaki Upanishad asserts that "external rituals such as Agnihotram offered in the morning and in the evening, must be replaced with inner Agnihotram, the ritual of introspection", and that "not rituals, but knowledge should be one's pursuit". The Mundaka Upanishad declares how man has been called upon, promised benefits for, scared unto and misled into performing sacrifices, oblations and pious works. Mundaka thereafter asserts this is foolish and frail, by those who encourage it and those who follow it, because it makes no difference to man's current life and after-life, it is like blind men leading the blind, it is a mark of conceit and vain knowledge, ignorant inertia like that of children, a futile useless practice. The Maitri Upanishad states,

The opposition to the ritual is not explicit in the oldest Upanishads. On occasions, the Upanishads extend the task of the Aranyakas by making the ritual allegorical and giving it a philosophical meaning. For example, the Brihadaranyaka interprets the practice of horse-sacrifice or ashvamedha allegorically. It states that the over-lordship of the earth may be acquired by sacrificing a horse. It then goes on to say that spiritual autonomy can only be achieved by renouncing the universe which is conceived in the image of a horse.

In similar fashion, Vedic gods such as the Agni, Aditya, Indra, Rudra, Visnu, Brahma, and others become equated in the Upanishads to the supreme, immortal, and incorporeal Brahman-Atman of the Upanishads, god becomes synonymous with self, and is declared to be everywhere, inmost being of each human being and within every living creature. The one reality or ekam sat of the Vedas becomes the ekam eva advitiyam or "the one and only and sans a second" in the Upanishads. Brahman-Atman and self-realization develops, in the Upanishad, as the means to moksha (liberation; freedom in this life or after-life).

According to Jayatilleke, the thinkers of Upanishadic texts can be grouped into two categories. One group, which includes early Upanishads along with some middle and late Upanishads, were composed by metaphysicians who used rational arguments and empirical experience to formulate their speculations and philosophical premises. The second group includes many middle and later Upanishads, where their authors professed theories based on yoga and personal experiences. Yoga philosophy and practice, adds Jayatilleke, is "not entirely absent in the Early Upanishads".

The development of thought in these Upanishadic theories contrasted with Buddhism, since the Upanishadic inquiry fails to find an empirical correlate of the assumed Atman, but nevertheless assumes its existence, "[reifying] consciousness as an eternal self." The Buddhist inquiry "is satisfied with the empirical investigation which shows that no such Atman exists because there is no evidence," states Jayatilleke.

Brahman and Atman

Two concepts that are of paramount importance in the Upanishads are Brahman and Atman. The Brahman is the ultimate reality and the Atman is individual self (soul). Brahman is the material, efficient, formal, and final cause of all that exists. It is the pervasive, genderless, infinite, eternal truth and bliss which does not change, yet is the cause of all changes. Brahman is "the infinite source, fabric, core and destiny of all existence, both manifested and unmanifested, the formless infinite substratum and from which the universe has grown". Brahman in Hinduism, states Paul Deussen, is the "creative principle which lies realized in the whole world".

The word Atman means the inner self, the soul, the immortal spirit in an individual, and all living beings including animals and trees. Ātman is a central idea in all the Upanishads, and "Know your Ātman" their thematic focus. These texts state that the inmost core of every person is not the body, nor the mind, nor the ego, but Atman – "soul" or "self". Atman is the spiritual essence in all creatures, their real innermost essential being. It is eternal, it is ageless. Atman is that which one is at the deepest level of one's existence.

Atman is the predominantly discussed topic in the Upanishads, but they express two distinct, somewhat divergent themes. Younger Upanishads state that Brahman (Highest Reality, Universal Principle, Being-Consciousness-Bliss) is identical with Atman, while older upanishads state Atman is part of Brahman but not identical. The Brahmasutra by Badarayana ( 100 BCE) synthesized and unified these somewhat conflicting theories. According to Nakamura, the Brahman sutras see Atman and Brahman as both different and not-different, a point of view which came to be called bhedabheda in later times. According to Koller, the Brahman sutras state that Atman and Brahman are different in some respects particularly during the state of ignorance, but at the deepest level and in the state of self-realization, Atman and Brahman are identical, non-different. This ancient debate flowered into various dual, non-dual theories in Hinduism.

Reality and Maya

Two different types of the non-dual Brahman-Atman are presented in the Upanishads, according to Mahadevan. The one in which the non-dual Brahman-Atman is the all-inclusive ground of the universe and another in which empirical, changing reality is an appearance (Maya).

The Upanishads describe the universe, and the human experience, as an interplay of Purusha (the eternal, unchanging principles, consciousness) and Prakṛti (the temporary, changing material world, nature). The former manifests itself as Ātman (soul, self), and the latter as Māyā. The Upanishads refer to the knowledge of Atman as "true knowledge" (Vidya), and the knowledge of Maya as "not true knowledge" (Avidya, Nescience, lack of awareness, lack of true knowledge).

Hendrick Vroom explains, "the term Maya [in the Upanishads] has been translated as 'illusion,' but then it does not concern normal illusion. Here 'illusion' does not mean that the world is not real and simply a figment of the human imagination. Maya means that the world is not as it seems; the world that one experiences is misleading as far as its true nature is concerned." According to Wendy Doniger, "to say that the universe is an illusion (māyā) is not to say that it is unreal; it is to say, instead, that it is not what it seems to be, that it is something constantly being made. Māyā not only deceives people about the things they think they know; more basically, it limits their knowledge."

In the Upanishads, Māyā is the perceived changing reality and it co-exists with Brahman which is the hidden true reality. Maya, or "illusion", is an important idea in the Upanishads, because the texts assert that in the human pursuit of blissful and liberating self-knowledge, it is Maya which obscures, confuses and distracts an individual.

Schools of Vedanta

The Upanishads form one of the three main sources for all schools of Vedanta, together with the Bhagavad Gita and the Brahmasutras. Due to the wide variety of philosophical teachings contained in the Upanishads, various interpretations could be grounded on the Upanishads. The schools of Vedānta seek to answer questions about the relation between atman and Brahman, and the relation between Brahman and the world. The schools of Vedanta are named after the relation they see between atman and Brahman:
 According to Advaita Vedanta, there is no difference.
 According to Vishishtadvaita the jīvātman is a part of Brahman, and hence is similar, but not identical.
 According to Dvaita, all individual souls (jīvātmans) and matter as eternal and mutually separate entities.

Other schools of Vedanta include Nimbarka's Dvaitadvaita, Vallabha's Suddhadvaita, and Chaitanya's Acintya Bhedabheda. The philosopher Adi Sankara has provided commentaries on 11 mukhya Upanishads.

Advaita Vedanta
Advaita literally means non-duality, and it is a monistic system of thought. It deals with the non-dual nature of Brahman and Atman. Advaita is considered the most influential sub-school of the Vedanta school of Hindu philosophy. Gaudapada was the first person to expound the basic principles of the Advaita philosophy in a commentary on the conflicting statements of the Upanishads. Gaudapada's Advaita ideas were further developed by Shankara (8th century CE). King states that Gaudapada's main work, Māṇḍukya Kārikā, is infused with philosophical terminology of Buddhism, and uses Buddhist arguments and analogies. King also suggests that there are clear differences between Shankara's writings and the Brahmasutra, and many ideas of Shankara are at odds with those in the Upanishads. Radhakrishnan, on the other hand, suggests that Shankara's views of Advaita were straightforward developments of the Upanishads and the Brahmasutra, and many ideas of Shankara derive from the Upanishads.

Shankara in his discussions of the Advaita Vedanta philosophy referred to the early Upanishads to explain the key difference between Hinduism and Buddhism, stating that Hinduism asserts that Atman (soul, self) exists, whereas Buddhism asserts that there is no soul, no self.

The Upanishads contain four sentences, the Mahāvākyas (Great Sayings), which were used by Shankara to establish the identity of Atman and Brahman as scriptural truth:
 "Prajñānam brahma" - "Consciousness is Brahman" (Aitareya Upanishad)
 "Aham brahmāsmi" - "I am Brahman" (Brihadaranyaka Upanishad)
 "Tat tvam asi" - "That Thou art" (Chandogya Upanishad)
 "Ayamātmā brahma" - "This Atman is Brahman" (Mandukya Upanishad)

Vishishtadvaita
The second school of Vedanta is the Vishishtadvaita, which was founded by Sri Ramanuja (1017–1137 CE). Sri Ramanuja disagreed with Adi Shankara and the Advaita school. Visistadvaita is a synthetic philosophy bridging the monistic Advaita and theistic Dvaita systems of Vedanta. Sri Ramanuja frequently cited the Upanishads, and stated that Vishishtadvaita is grounded in the Upanishads.

Sri Ramanuja's Vishishtadvaita interpretation of the Upanishad is a qualified monism. Sri Ramanuja interprets the Upanishadic literature to be teaching a body-soul theory, states Jeaneane Fowler – a professor of Philosophy and Religious Studies, where the Brahman is the dweller in all things, yet also distinct and beyond all things, as the soul, the inner controller, the immortal. The Upanishads, according to the Vishishtadvaita school, teach individual souls to be of the same quality as the Brahman, but quantitatively they are distinct.

In the Vishishtadvaita school, the Upanishads are interpreted to be teaching an Ishwar (Vishnu), which is the seat of all auspicious qualities, with all of the empirically perceived world as the body of God who dwells in everything. The school recommends a devotion to godliness and constant remembrance of the beauty and love of personal god. This ultimately leads one to the oneness with abstract Brahman. The Brahman in the Upanishads is a living reality, states Fowler, and "the Atman of all things and all beings" in Sri Ramanuja's interpretation.

Dvaita
The third school of Vedanta called the Dvaita school was founded by Madhvacharya (1199–1278 CE). It is regarded as a strongly theistic philosophic exposition of the Upanishads. Madhvacharya, much like Adi Shankara claims for Advaita, and Sri Ramanuja claims for Vishishtadvaita, states that his theistic Dvaita Vedanta is grounded in the Upanishads.

According to the Dvaita school, states Fowler, the "Upanishads that speak of the soul as Brahman, speak of resemblance and not identity". Madhvacharya interprets the Upanishadic teachings of the self becoming one with Brahman, as "entering into Brahman", just like a drop enters an ocean. This to the Dvaita school implies duality and dependence, where Brahman and Atman are different realities. Brahman is a separate, independent and supreme reality in the Upanishads, Atman only resembles the Brahman in limited, inferior, dependent manner according to Madhvacharya.

Sri Ramanuja's Vishishtadvaita school and Shankara's Advaita school are both nondualism Vedanta schools, both are premised on the assumption that all souls can hope for and achieve the state of blissful liberation; in contrast, Madhvacharya believed that some souls are eternally doomed and damned.

Similarities with Platonic thought

Several scholars have recognised parallels between the philosophy of Pythagoras and Plato and that of the Upanishads, including their ideas on sources of knowledge, concept of justice and path to salvation, and Plato's allegory of the cave. Platonic psychology with its divisions of reason, spirit and appetite, also bears resemblance to the three gunas in the Indian philosophy of Samkhya.

Various mechanisms for such a transmission of knowledge have been conjectured including Pythagoras traveling as far as India; Indian philosophers visiting Athens and meeting Socrates; Plato encountering the ideas when in exile in Syracuse; or, intermediated through Persia.

However, other scholars, such as Arthur Berriedale Keith, J. Burnet and A. R. Wadia, believe that the two systems developed independently. They note that there is no historical evidence of the philosophers of the two schools meeting, and point out significant differences in the stage of development, orientation and goals of the two philosophical systems. Wadia writes that Plato's metaphysics were rooted in this life and his primary aim was to develop an ideal state. In contrast, Upanishadic focus was the individual, the self (atman, soul), self-knowledge, and the means of an individual's moksha (freedom, liberation in this life or after-life).

Translations
The Upanishads have been translated into various languages including Persian, Italian, Urdu, French, Latin, German, English, Dutch, Polish, Japanese, Spanish and Russian. The Mughal Emperor Akbar's reign (1556–1586) saw the first translations of the Upanishads into Persian. His great-grandson, Dara Shukoh, produced a collection called Sirr-i-Akbar in 1656, wherein 50 Upanishads were translated from Sanskrit into Persian.

Anquetil-Duperron, a French Orientalist, received a manuscript of the Oupanekhat and translated the Persian version into French and Latin, publishing the Latin translation in two volumes in 1801–1802 as Oupneck'hat. The French translation was never published. More recently, several translations in french of some Upanishads or the whole of 108 have been published : by indianists Louis Renou , Kausitaki, Svetasvatra, Prasna, Taittiriya Upanisads, 1948; Jean Varenne, Mahâ-Nârâyana Upanisad, 1960, and Sept Upanishads, 1981; Alyette Degrâces-Fadh, Samnyâsa-Upanisad (Upanisad du renoncement) , 1989; Martine Buttex, Les 108 Upanishads (full translation), 2012.
 
The Latin version was the initial introduction of the Upanishadic thought to Western scholars. However, according to Deussen, the Persian translators took great liberties in translating the text and at times changed the meaning.

The first Sanskrit-to-English translation of the Aitareya Upanishad was made by Colebrooke in 1805, and the first English translation of the Kena Upanishad was made by Rammohun Roy in 1816.

The first German translation appeared in 1832 and Roer's English version appeared in 1853. However, Max Mueller's 1879 and 1884 editions were the first systematic English treatment to include the 12 Principal Upanishads. Other major translations of the Upanishads have been by Robert Ernest Hume (13 Principal Upanishads), Paul Deussen (60 Upanishads), Sarvepalli Radhakrishnan (18 Upanishads), Patrick Olivelle (32 Upanishads in two books) and Bhānu Swami (13 Upanishads with commentaries of Vaiṣṇava ācāryas). Olivelle's translation won the 1998 A.K. Ramanujan Book Prize for Translation.

Throughout the 1930s, Irish poet W. B. Yeats worked with the Indian-born mendicant-teacher Shri Purohit Swami on their own translation of the Upanishads, eventually titled The Ten Principal Upanishads and published in 1938. This translation was the final piece of work published by Yeats before his death less than a year later.

Reception in the West

The German philosopher Arthur Schopenhauer read the Latin translation and praised the Upanishads in his main work, The World as Will and Representation (1819), as well as in his Parerga and Paralipomena (1851). He found his own philosophy was in accord with the Upanishads, which taught that the individual is a manifestation of the one basis of reality. For Schopenhauer, that fundamentally real underlying unity is what we know in ourselves as "will". Schopenhauer used to keep a copy of the Latin Oupnekhet by his side and commented,

Schopenhauer's philosophy influenced many famous people and introduced them to the Upanishads. One of them was the Austrian Physicist Erwin Schrödinger, who once wrote:

Another German philosopher, Friedrich Wilhelm Joseph Schelling, praised the ideas in the Upanishads, as did others. In the United States, the group known as the Transcendentalists were influenced by the German idealists. Americans, such as Emerson and Thoreau embraced Schelling's interpretation of Kant's Transcendental idealism, as well as his celebration of the romantic, exotic, mystical aspect of the Upanishads. As a result of the influence of these writers, the Upanishads gained renown in Western countries. Danish physicist  Niels Bohr said, “I go to the Upanishad to ask questions.”

The poet T. S. Eliot, inspired by his reading of the Upanishads, based the final portion of his famous poem The Waste Land (1922) upon one of its verses. According to Eknath Easwaran, the Upanishads are snapshots of towering peaks of consciousness.

Juan Mascaró, a professor at the University of Barcelona and a translator of the Upanishads, states that the Upanishads represents for the Hindu approximately what the New Testament represents for the Christian, and that the message of the Upanishads can be summarized in the words, "the kingdom of God is within you".

Paul Deussen in his review of the Upanishads, states that the texts emphasize Brahman-Atman as something that can be experienced, but not defined. This view of the soul and self are similar, states Deussen, to those found in the dialogues of Plato and elsewhere. The Upanishads insisted on oneness of soul, excluded all plurality, and therefore, all proximity in space, all succession in time, all interdependence as cause and effect, and all opposition as subject and object. Max Müller, in his review of the Upanishads, summarizes the lack of systematic philosophy and the central theme in the Upanishads as follows,

See also

 The 100 Most Influential Books Ever Written
 Bhagavad Gita
 Hinduism
 Prasthanatrayi
 Principal Upanishads

Notes

References

Sources

Further reading
 
 
 
 
 
 Müller, Max, translator, Part I, New York: Dover Publications (1879; Reprinted in 1962), 
 Müller, Max, translator, Part II, New York: Dover Publications (1884; Reprinted in 1962),

External links

 The Upanishads translated into English by Swami Paramananda
 Complete set of 108 Upanishads, Manuscripts with the commentary of Brahma-Yogin, Adyar Library
 Upanishads, Sanskrit documents in various formats
 The Upaniṣads article in the Internet Encyclopedia of Philosophy
 The Theory of 'Soul' in the Upanishads, T. W. Rhys Davids (1899)
 Spinozistic Substance and Upanishadic Self: A Comparative Study, M. S. Modak (1931)
 W. B. Yeats and the Upanishads, A. Davenport (1952)
 The Concept of Self in the Upanishads: An Alternative Interpretation, D. C. Mathur (1972)

 
Ancient yoga texts
Hindu texts
Sanskrit texts
Works of unknown authorship